Plamen Plamenov Andreev (born 15 December 2004) is a Bulgarian footballer who plays as a goalkeeper for Bulgarian First League club Levski Sofia.

Career
Andreev made his senior debut for Levski Sofia on 23 May 2021, entering for the last 10 minutes of the final game of the season against Cherno More. 
He was the starting goalkeeper and captain throughout the 2021–22 Bulgarian Cup won by Levski, conceding only 2 goals and keeping 5 clean sheets across all 6 games.

In August 2022, Andreev was placed 22nd in a CIES ranking for most promising 2004-born players worldwide.

Career statistics

Club

Honours

Club
Levski Sofia
 Bulgarian Cup (1): 2021–22

References

External links
 
 Profile at LevskiSofia.info

Living people
2004 births
Bulgarian footballers
Association football goalkeepers
PFC Levski Sofia players
First Professional Football League (Bulgaria) players
Bulgaria youth international footballers
Footballers from Sofia